Pachygonidia caliginosa is a moth of the family Sphingidae first described by Jean Baptiste Boisduval in 1870.

Distribution 
It is known from Brazil, Bolivia and Venezuela.

Description 
The wingspan is about 70 mm. The forewings are similar to those of Pachygonidia subhamata, but the apex is pointed. There are two median transverse pinkish-buff bands on the hindwing upperside.

Biology 
There are probably multiple generations per year with one record from March in Brazil.

References

Pachygonidia
Moths described in 1870
Sphingidae of South America
Moths of South America